Loukov is a municipality and village in Kroměříž District in the Zlín Region of the Czech Republic. It has about 900 inhabitants.

Administrative parts
The village of Libosváry is an administrative part of Loukov.

References

Villages in Kroměříž District